earthlings? is an American psychedelic rock band based in Joshua Tree, California. The band includes members from Queens of the Stone Age, Desert Sessions, Eagles of Death Metal, Kyuss, Masters of Reality, Goatsnake, The Twilight Singers, Gutter Twins, Yellow #5, Legal Weapon, Sea Hags, Modifiers, Orquesta del Desierto and UNKLE.

The band was formed in Joshua Tree, California, at Rancho De La Luna by Dave Catching, Fred Drake, and Pete Stahl in 1994.

Members 
Current
Dave Catching – guitar, bass, keyboards, engineering (1994–present; owner of Rancho De La Luna)
Pete Stahl – vocals, loops, guitar, verbulator, bass (1994–present)
Adam Maples – drums, vocals, guitar (2003–present)
Edmund Monsef – guitar, bass, keyboards, engineering, owner of The Hacienda (2008–present)

Former
Fred Drake – keyboards, guitars, bass, engineering, co-owner of Rancho De La Luna (1994–2002) (died 2002)

Other contributors
Molly McGuire – bass, accordion, backing vocals
Wendy Rae Fowler – bass, backing vocals
Gene Trautmann – drums, backing vocals
Joshua Homme – guitar, bass, backing vocals
Dave Grohl – drums
Clint Walsh – guitar, bass, keyboards, vocals
Jonathan Hischke – bass, noises
Victoria Williams – vocals, bass, theremin
Tony Mason – guitar, engineering

Discography

Albums 
earthlings? – 1998, Released on Crippled Dick Hot Wax in Europe and re-released on Man's Ruin Records in the US in 2000.
Human Beans – 2000, Released on Man's Ruin Records in the US in both CD and Special Edition 3x10" LP and released under Crippled Dick Hot Wax in Europe.
Mudda Fudda – 2016, Released on Last Hurrah Records in the US on limited edition vinyl only.

Singles and EPs 
Johnny B. Goode/Pleasure Seekers – 1999, released on Crippled Dick Hot Wax.
Disco Marching Kraft – 2003, released on Crippled Dick Hot Wax.
Individual Sky Cruiser Theory – 2005, released on Empirical Recordings as a 7" vinyl-only release.
humalien – 2009, released on Treasure Craft Records as a 10" vinyl and digital release.
ecaps – 2014, released on BandCamp as a digital release.

e3 
e3 is the proposed title of the album from which the singles/EPs Disco Marching Kraft and Individual Sky Cruiser Theory come. It was in production after Human Beans was released, but fans shared a leaked version. Most of the songs were released on the Mudda Fudda album.

Other contributions 
The Desert Sessions Volumes 3 & 4 – 1997, Submitted two tracks ("At the Helms of Hells Ships" and "Sugar Rush"). Released on Man's Ruin Records.

References

External links 

American stoner rock musical groups
Man's Ruin Records artists
Psychedelic rock music groups from California